Bersihkan Dirimu is the first extended play album by Indonesian singer Afgan Syahreza. It was released in 2009. The album has four songs, including Pencari Jalan-Mu and Pada-Mu Kubersujud. The single Terima Kasih Cinta was taken from a previous album, Confession No.1.

Track listing

References

2009 EPs
Afgansyah Reza albums
Indonesian-language albums